The Embassy of Mexico in London is the diplomatic mission of Mexico in the United Kingdom. Mexico also maintains a building at 8 Halkin Street in Belgravia which serves as the Ambassador’s Official Residence.

In 2011 a pro-Zapatista demonstration was held at the embassy, with the Mexican tricolour being replaced with the Zapatista flag.

The embassy building in St George's Street, together with its neighbour, is Grade II listed.

Ambassador
The Ambassador of Mexico to the Court of St James is the highest ranking diplomatic representative of the United Mexican States to the United Kingdom.

Gallery

See also

Foreign relations of Mexico
List of diplomatic missions of Mexico
Secretariat of Foreign Affairs

References

External links
Official site
Mexican Ministry of Foreign Affairs

Mexico
London
Mexico–United Kingdom relations
Mexico
Grade II listed buildings in the City of Westminster